Banu Nawfal is a notable Arabic sub-clan of the Quraish tribe. Its progenitor is Nawfal ibn Abd Manaf.

Chief: Mut`im ibn ‘Adi

References

Nawfal